Tongeia is a Palearctic genus of butterflies in the family Lycaenidae found in temperate East Asia. Most species are endemic to China and many species are recently described from China. The best known species is the more widely distributed Tongeia fischeri (Fischer's blue).

Species 
 Tongeia amplifascia Huang, 2001
 Tongeia arata Yakovlev, 2009
 Tongeia arcana (Leech, 1890)
 Tongeia bella Huang, 2001
 Tongeia bisudu Zhdanko & Yakovlev, 2001
 Tongeia burte Churkin, 2003
 Tongeia confusa Huang, 2003
 Tongeia davidi (Poujade, 1884)
 Tongeia dongchuanensis H. Huang & Z. Chen, 2006
 Tongeia filicaudis） (Pryer, 1877)
 Tongeia fischeri (Eversmann, 1843) Fischer's blue
 Tongeia germani Yakovlev, 2004
 Tongeia hainani (Bethune-Baker, 1914)
 Tongeia ion (Leech, 1891)
 Tongeia kala de Nicéville, 1890)
 Tongeia menpae Huang, 1998
 Tongeia minima Shou & Yuan, 2006
 Tongeia potanini (Alphéraky, 1889)
 Tongeia pseudozuthus Huang, 2001
 Tongeia shaolinensis Z.G. Wang & Y. Niu, 2002
 Tongeia zuthus (Leech, 1893)

See also
List of butterflies of China (Lycaenidae)

External links

"Tongeia Tutt, [1908]" at Markku Savela's Lepidoptera and some other life forms
Jeratthitikul, E. Yago, M. Shizuya, H. Yokoyama, J. Tsutomu, H. 2011 " Life history and morphology of the black cupid butterfly, Tongeia kala (de Nicéville) (Lycaenidae), from Myanmar", pdf, Journal of the Lepidopterists' Society

Polyommatini
Lycaenidae genera
Taxa named by J. W. Tutt